Willi Schur (22 August 1888 – 1 November 1940) was a German actor and singer. He appeared in roughly ninety feature films in a variety of supporting roles.

Selected filmography
 Berlin-Alexanderplatz (1931)
 Who Takes Love Seriously? (1931)
 The Captain from Köpenick (1931)
 All is at Stake (1932)
 Dreaming Lips (1932)
 Sacred Waters (1932)
 Gypsies of the Night (1932)
 The Victor (1932)
 The Invisible Front (1932)
 A Tremendously Rich Man (1932)
 Five from the Jazz Band (1932)
 The Racokzi March (1933)
 A City Upside Down (1933)
 The House of Dora Green (1933)
 The Star of Valencia (1933)
 Gold (1934)
 My Heart Calls You (1934)
 Police Report (1934)
 The Grand Duke's Finances (1934)
 Hard Luck Mary (1934)
 Music in the Blood (1934)
 The Double (1934)
 Miss Liselott (1934)
 Trouble with Jolanthe (1934)
 Master of the World (1934)
 Don't Lose Heart, Suzanne! (1935)
 Blood Brothers (1935)
 Everything for a Woman (1935)
 Ave Maria (1936)
 The Impossible Woman (1936)
 The Court Concert (1936)
 Stadt Anatol (1936)
 Under Blazing Heavens (1936)
 The Mysterious Mister X (1936)
 White Slaves (1937)
 Pat und Patachon im Paradies (1937)
 His Best Friend (1937)
 The Irresistible Man (1937)
 The Man Who Was Sherlock Holmes (1937)
 The Woman at the Crossroads (1938)
 By a Silken Thread (1938)
 Men, Animals and Sensations (1938)
 Dance on the Volcano (1938)
 Storms in May (1938)
 The Impossible Mister Pitt (1938)
 Secret Code LB 17 (1938)
 Napoleon Is to Blame for Everything (1938)
 Madame Butterfly (1939)
 Mistake of the Heart (1939)
 Robert and Bertram (1939)
 Marriage in Small Doses (1939)
 Congo Express (1939)
 Twilight (1940)

Bibliography
 O'Brien, Mary-Elizabeth. Nazi Cinema as Enchantment: The Politics of Entertainment in the Third Reich. Camden House, 2006.

External links

1888 births
1940 deaths
German male film actors
20th-century German male singers
Actors from Wrocław
People from the Province of Silesia
20th-century German male actors